Marcel Girard Brache (born 15 October 1987) is an American rugby union player. Brache was born in Los Angeles, California and was raised primarily in South Africa. He currently plays for the Austin Gilgronis of Major League Rugby (MLR), generally as a centre but can also play wing.

Rugby career
Brache represented Western Province from 2011 to 2013 in the Currie Cup and Vodacom Cup. Brache represented the Stormers in Super Rugby during the 2012 season where he made 1 substitute appearance, but did not make the Stormers squad for the 2013 season.
Brache previously played for the Ikey Tigers in the Varsity Cup.

Brache joined Australian Super Rugby side the Western Force in late 2013 on a two-year deal before the 2014 Super Rugby season. Brache has played over 30 games for Western Force since his debut before scoring a try.

He signed for Major League Rugby team Austin Gilgronis ahead of the 2022 season.

International
Brache represents the United States national team at the international level and is eligible by birth. Brache debuted for the United States during the November 2016 tests.

Super Rugby statistics

References

External links 

Stormers profile

1987 births
South African rugby union players
Stormers players
Western Province (rugby union) players
Western Force players
Expatriate rugby union players in Australia
South African expatriates in Australia
Rugby union centres
University of Cape Town alumni
Living people
Perth Spirit players
United States international rugby union players
Rugby union wings
Rugby union fullbacks
American rugby union players
Austin Gilgronis players
San Diego Legion players